Admiral Tibet (sometimes Tibett), also known as "Mr. Reality" (born Kenneth Allen, Freehill, Saint Mary, Jamaica, 1960) is a Jamaican dancehall singer known for his "cultural" lyrics.

Biography
Tibet was one of the few artists from the early days of digital reggae to focus on "conscious" themes in his lyrics. A member of the Twelve tribes of Israel since his youth. He has been described as "the most consistently conscious singer of his age". Allen described how he got his nickname: "I was going primary school and my cousin, both of us were sitting together looking into an atlas, and saw the name 'Tibet'. My cousin took it as a mockery and seh 'Tibet! Tibet!' and it stuck."

He began performing in Jamaican clubs and with sound systems during his teens, including his local Torpedo system. He made his first recordings when he was in his 20s; a reluctance to move to Kingston played a part in this. He eventually made the move in 1982.
In 1985, Tibet made his first recording for producer Sherman Clacher, entitled "Babylon War", Shortly after this he began recording for Winston Riley where he recorded the song "Leave People Business", Redman, King Jammy, where he had recorded songs like "Chase Them Jah" in 1986 and other songs like his Biggest hit song "Serious Time" In 1987, and Bobby Digital. His debut album Come into the Light was produced by King Jammy and released in 1987. He recorded several more albums in the late 1980s and early 1990s. He appeared at the Reggae Sunsplash festival in 1989. He was less prolific in the 1990s but returned with more albums in the 2000s, and is still performing in the late 2000s.

His hit "Serious Time" was later issued in remixed form with contributions from two-time Grammy winner Shabba Ranks and Ninjaman, signalling a reconciliation between the two deejays who had been bitter rivals for some time.

His voice has been described: "at its best has a convincing, vulnerable quality entirely suited to sufferers' laments."

Discography
Come into the Light (1987) Live & Love
The Time is Going to Come (1988) Puppy
War in Babylon (1988) RAS
Two Good to be True (1990) Blue Mountain (with Thriller U)
Reality Time (1991) Digital B/VP
Separate Class (1991) Digital B/VP
Excitement (1995) Musidisc
Weeping & Mourning (1997) Melodie
Time Is Going to Come (1999) Rhino
Try To Reach The Top (2000) Brick Wall
Things That You Do (2000) TP
Fire Fire Burning (2002) Heartbeat (with Michael Rose)
Determination (2003-01-03) Humal
Time Alone Will Tell (2003) Artists Only
Running from Reality (2006) Super Power
Gone nowhere(2015) EarlyDays Records, France

References

1960 births
Jamaican reggae musicians
Ragga musicians
People from Saint Mary Parish, Jamaica
Living people
Rhino Records artists